Taiga Kawabe is a Japanese kickboxer, fighting out of Japan. He is the former Krush Super Bantamweight and K-1 Super Featherweight champion, as well as a two-time K-1 Grand Prix runner-up.

Taiga is the younger brother of Hiroya, who inspired him along with the two time K-1 Max World Champion Masato to start practicing Karate in his childhood, becoming a Black Belt at the fifth grade. 

He was ranked as a top ten bantamweight in the world by Combat Press between April 2018 and January 2019.

Kickboxing career

Early career
Taiga made his professional debut against Ryota at Krush-EX 2012 vol.6, winning by a third-round TKO. He won his next three fights by unanimous decision, before participating in the Krush Youth Super Bantamweight Grand Prix. He won the tournament with a split decision against Namito Izawa in the semifinals and a unanimous decision against Ryuji Horio in the finals.

After an extra round decision win against Yuya Suzuki at Krush.41, Taiga won the Krush Super Bantamweight title with a unanimous decision victory over Shota Takiya.

K-1

Early K-1 career
Taiga made his K-1 debut against Takeru Segawa at the K-1 World GP 2014 -65kg Championship Tournament event. Taiga lost the fight by a spinning backfist knockout. It was both the first loss and the first knockout loss of his career.

Immediately following this loss, Taiga was scheduled to take part in the K-1 Super Bantamweight Grand Prix, to crown the inaugural champion. He defeated Soufiane El Haji by unanimous decision in the quarterfinals and Nobuchika Terado by a third-round knockout in the semifinals. In a rematch with Takeru Segawa in the tournament finals, Taiga once again came up short, losing by unanimous decision.

At K-1 World GP 2015 The Championship, Taiga fought the future Krush Super Featherweight champion Leona Pettas. Pettas won the fight by a majority decision. Returning to Krush, Taiga bounced back from this losing skid with a second-round knockout of Taishi Hiratsuka.

K-1 Super Featherweight tournament
Taiga took part in the K-1 World GP 2016 -60kg Japan Tournament. He scored a first-round flying knee knockout of Masahiro Yamamoto in the quarterfinals, and a first-round left-hook knockout of Toshi in the semifinals. Taiga won the tournament with a unanimous decision win against Koya Urabe.

Winning this tournament earned him a place in the K-1 World GP 2016 -60kg Japan Tournament. He won his quarterfinal bout against Javier Hernández by TKO, after his opponent retired at the end of the second round. He beat Hirotaka Urabe by unanimous decision in the semifinals. Taiga fought a rematch with Koya Urabe in the tournament finals, and lost by TKO, after being knocked down three times inside of the first 90 seconds.

K-1 title reign
After beating Chen Wende at the Wu Lin Feng 2016: WLF x Krush - China vs Japan event, Taiga was given the chance to challenge Hirotaka Urabe for the K-1 Super Featherweight title. He beat Urabe by unanimous decision.

Four months after winning the title, Taiga was scheduled to fight Koji in a non-title bout. He won the fight by unanimous decision.

In his last fight with the promotion, Taiga was scheduled to fight Stavros Exakoustidis. Exakoustidis won the fight by a first-round knockout.

Moving away from K-1, Taiga participated in the Kunlun Fight 74 61.5kg Tournament, being scheduled to fight Lin Qiangbang in the quarterfinals. Qiangbang won the fight by majority decision.

RIZIN
Taiga made his promotional debut with RIZIN against Kento Haraguchi at Rizin 13. The fight ended in a draw.

Taiga would lose his next two fights to Zhu Xu at Emei Legend 36 by majority decision, and to Saeksan Or. Kwanmuang at Rise by unanimous decision.

Kawabe was scheduled to fight Thalisson Gomes Ferreira at Rizin 15. Taiga once again lost, after being knocked down three times inside of the second round.

His third appearance for RIZIN was at Rizin 17, when he was scheduled to fight Hikaru Machida. Taiga managed to beat Machida by unanimous decision.

After his first victory in over two years, Taiga was scheduled to fight the former RISE Lightweight champion Taiju Shiratori at Rizin 19. Shiratori won the fight by unanimous decision. The two of them fought an immediate rematch at Rizin 20. Shiratori once again won, this time by TKO, as Taiga was unable to continue after the second round due to a cut.

Taiga was next scheduled to fight the reigning RISE Lightweight champion Kento Haraguchi at Rizin 23. Taiga lost the fight by a first-round knockout.

Following these three losses, Taiga was scheduled to fight Yuma Yamahata at Rizin 25. He snapped the second losing streak of his career with a unanimous decision victory over Yamahata.

Taiga was next scheduled to fight Kanta Motoyama at Rizin 27. He dominated throughout the three rounds and won a unanimous decision.

RISE
Taiga was scheduled to fight Kan Nakamura at RISE WORLD SERIES 2021 on July 18, 2021. He lost the fight by majority decision.

Taiga was scheduled to face Genji Umeno at RISE World Series 2021 Osaka 2 on November 14, 2021. He won the fight by unanimous decision.

Taiga was booked to face Ryo Takahashi at Rizin 34 – Osaka on March 20, 2022. The bout was ruled a majority decision draw.

Taiga faced Soichiro Arata at Rizin 36 – Okinawa on July 2, 2022. He won the fight by unanimous decision, with all three judges scoring the fight 30–24 in his favor, as he had knocked Arata down in every round of the bout.

Taiga faced Shota Okudeira in a super featherweight (-60 kg) bout at RISE World Series 2022 on October 15, 2022. The fight was ruled a split decision draw after the first three rounds, with one scorecard of 30–28 for Okudeira and one scorecard of 30–29 for Taiga, while the third judge had it as an even 30–30 draw. Taiga was awarded a unanimous decision following an extra fourth round.

Titles and accomplishments
K-1
 2017 K-1 -60kg World Champion
 2016 K-1 World GP 2016 -60kg World Tournament Runner-Up
 2016 K-1 -60kg Japan Tournament Champion
 2015 K-1 World GP -55kg Championship Tournament Runner-Up

Krush
 2014 Krush Super Bantamweight Champion
 2013 Krush Youth GP -55kg Tournament Champion

Awards
eFight.jp
Fighter of the Month (April 2016)

Fight record

|-  style="text-align:center; background:#"
| 2023-03-26 || ||align=left| Kazuma || RISE ELDORADO 2023 || Tokyo, Japan ||  || ||
|-  style="text-align:center; background:#cfc"
| 2022-10-15 || Win ||align=left| Shota Okudaira || RISE World Series 2022 || Tokyo, Japan || Ext.R Decision (Unanimous) ||4 ||3:00
|-
|-  style="text-align:center; background:#cfc"
| 2022-07-02 || Win || align=left| Soichiro Arata || Rizin 36 – Okinawa || Okinawa, Japan || Decision (Unanimous) || 3 || 3:00 
|-  style="text-align:center; background:#c5d2ea"
| 2022-03-20 || Draw|| align=left| Ryo Takahashi || Rizin 34 – Osaka || Osaka, Japan || Decision (Majority) || 3 || 3:00
|-  style="text-align:center; background:#cfc"
| 2021-11-14 ||Win || align=left| Genji Umeno || RISE World Series 2021 Osaka 2 || Osaka, Japan || Decision (Unanimous) || 3 ||3:00 
|-  style="background:#fbb;"
| 2021-07-18||Loss||align=left| Kan Nakamura || RISE WORLD SERIES 2021  || Osaka, Japan || Decision (Majority) ||3  ||3:00
|-  style="background:#cfc;"
| 2021-03-21 || Win ||align=left| Kanta Motoyama|| Rizin 27 – Nagoya || Nagoya, Japan || Decision (unanimous) || 3 || 3:00
|-  style="background:#cfc;"
| 2020-11-21 || Win ||align=left| Yuma Yamahata|| Rizin 25 – Osaka || Osaka, Japan || Decision (unanimous) || 3 || 3:00
|-  style="background:#fbb;"
| 2020-08-10 || Loss ||align=left| Kento Haraguchi|| Rizin 23 – Yokohama || Yokohama, Japan || KO (Punches) || 1 || 2:50
|-  style="background:#Fbb;"
| 2019-12-31|| Loss ||align=left| Taiju Shiratori || Rizin 20 - Saitama || Saitama, Japan || TKO (Doctor Stoppage/cut) || 2  || 3:00
|-  style="background:#Fbb;"
| 2019-10-12|| Loss ||align=left| Taiju Shiratori||Rizin 19 - Osaka|| Osaka, Japan|| Decision (Unanimous) || 3 || 3:00
|-  style="background:#cfc;"
| 2019-07-27|| Win ||align=left| Hikaru Machida || Rizin 17 - Saitama || Saitama, Japan || Decision (Unanimous) || 3 || 3:00
|-  style="background:#Fbb;"
| 2019-04-21|| Loss||align=left| Thalisson Gomes Ferreira || Rizin 15 - Yokohama || Yokohama, Japan || TKO (3 knockdowns rule) || 2 || 2:34
|-  style="background:#Fbb;"
| 2019-03-10|| Loss||align=left| Saeksan Or. Kwanmuang || Rise World Series 2019 First Round || Tokyo, Japan || Decision (Unanimous) || 3 || 3:00
|-  style="background:#Fbb;"
| 2019-01-12|| Loss ||align=left| Zhu Xu||Emei Legend 36|| China|| Decision (Majority) || 3 || 3:00
|-  bgcolor=#c5d2ea
| 2018-09-30|| Draw||align=left| Kento Haraguchi || Rizin 13 - Saitama || Saitama, Japan || Decision || 3 || 3:00
|-  style="background:#Fbb;"
| 2018-05-13|| Loss ||align=left| Lin Qiangbang || Kunlun Fight 74 61.5kg Tournament, Quarter Finals|| China|| Decision (Majority) || 3 || 3:00
|-  style="background:#Fbb;"
| 2017-09-18|| Loss ||align=left| Stavros Exakoustidis || K-1 World GP 2017 Welterweight Championship Tournament|| Tokyo, Japan|| KO (3 Knockdowns/Left Hook) || 1 || 2:41
|-
|-  style="background:#cfc;"
| 2017-06-18|| Win ||align=left| Koji ||K-1 World GP 2017 Super Welterweight Championship Tournament || Tokyo, Japan|| Decision (Unanimous) || 3 || 3:00
|-
|-  style="background:#cfc;"
| 2017-02-25|| Win ||align=left| Hirotaka Urabe || K-1 World GP 2017 Lightweight Championship Tournament || Tokyo, Japan|| Decision (Unanimous) || 3 || 3:00
|-
! style=background:white colspan=9 |
|-
|-  style="background:#cfc;"
| 2016-12-03|| Win ||align=left| Chen Wende|| Wu Lin Feng 2016: WLF x Krush - China vs Japan|| Zhengzhou, China || Decision (Unanimous) || 3 || 3:00
|-
|-  style="background:#Fbb;"
| 2016-09-19|| Loss ||align=left| Koya Urabe|| K-1 World GP 2016 -60kg World Tournament, Final|| Tokyo, Japan|| KO (3 Knockdowns/Left Cross) || 1 || 1:30
|-
! style=background:white colspan=9 |
|-
|-  style="background:#cfc;"
| 2016-09-19|| Win ||align=left| Hirotaka Urabe || K-1 World GP 2016 -60kg World Tournament, Semi Finals || Tokyo, Japan|| Decision (Unanimous) || 3 || 3:00
|-
|-  style="background:#cfc;"
| 2016-09-19|| Win ||align=left|  Javier Hernández || K-1 World GP 2016 -60kg World Tournament, Quarter Finals || Tokyo, Japan|| TKO (retirement) || 2 || 3:00
|-
|-  style="background:#cfc;"
| 2016-04-24|| Win ||align=left| Koya Urabe|| K-1 World GP 2016 -60kg Japan Tournament, Final || Tokyo, Japan|| Decision (Unanimous) || 3 || 3:00
|-
! style=background:white colspan=9 |
|-
|-  style="background:#cfc;"
| 2016-04-24|| Win ||align=left| Toshi || K-1 World GP 2016 -60kg Japan Tournament, Semi Finals || Tokyo, Japan|| KO (Left Hook) || 1 || 0:54
|-
|-  style="background:#cfc;"
| 2016-04-24|| Win ||align=left| Masahiro Yamamoto|| K-1 World GP 2016 -60kg Japan Tournament, Quarter Finals || Tokyo, Japan|| KO (Left Flying Knee) || 1 || 1:48
|-
|-  style="background:#cfc;"
| 2016-02-05 || Win ||align=left| Taishi Hiratsuka || Krush.63 || Tokyo, Japan ||  KO (Left Hook) || 2 || 2:46
|-
|-  style="background:#Fbb;"
| 2015-11-21|| Loss ||align=left| Leona Pettas || K-1 World GP 2015 The Championship || Tokyo, Japan || Decision (Majority)|| 3 || 3:00
|-
|-  style="background:#Fbb;"
| 2015-04-19|| Loss ||align=left| Takeru || K-1 World GP 2015 -55kg Championship Tournament, Final || Tokyo, Japan || Decision (Unanimous)|| 3 || 3:00
|-
! style=background:white colspan=9 |
|-  style="background:#cfc;"
| 2015-04-19|| Win||align=left| Nobuchika Terado || K-1 World GP 2015 -55kg Championship Tournament, Semi Finals || Tokyo, Japan || KO (Right Hook)|| 3 || 2:40
|-
|-  style="background:#cfc;"
| 2015-04-19|| Win||align=left| Soufiane El Haji || K-1 World GP 2015 -55kg Championship Tournament, Quarter Finals || Tokyo, Japan || Decision (Unanimous)|| 3 || 3:00
|-
|-  style="background:#Fbb;"
| 2014-11-03|| Loss||align=left| Takeru || K-1 World GP 2014 -65kg Championship Tournament || Tokyo, Japan || KO (Spinning Back Fist)|| 3 || 0:13
|-
|-  style="background:#cfc;"
| 2014-08-24 || Win ||align=left| Shota Takiya || Krush.45 || Nagoya, Japan ||  Decision (Unanimous)  || 3 || 3:00
|-
! style=background:white colspan=9 |
|-
|-  style="background:#cfc;"
| 2014-05-11 || Win ||align=left| Yuya Suzuki || Krush.41|| Tokyo, Japan || Ext.R Decision (Unanimous)  || 3 || 3:00
|-
|-  style="background:#cfc;"
| 2013-12-14 || Win ||align=left| Ryuji Horio || Krush.35 - Youth Grand Prix, Final || Tokyo, Japan ||  Decision (Unanimous)  || 3 || 3:00
|-
! style=background:white colspan=9 |
|-
|-  style="background:#cfc;"
| 2013-10-13 || Win ||align=left| Namito Izawa || Krush-IGNITION 2013 vol.6 - Youth Grand Prix, Semi Finals || Tokyo, Japan || Ext.R Decision (Split)  || 4 || 3:00
|-
|-  style="background:#cfc;"
| 2013-10-13 || Win ||align=left| Masahiro|| Krush-IGNITION 2013 vol.6 - Youth Grand Prix, Quarter Finals || Tokyo, Japan || Ext.R Decision (Unanimous)  || 4 || 3:00
|-
|-  style="background:#cfc;"
| 2013-09-01 || Win ||align=left| Hiraoka Seiji|| J-NETWORK "J-FIGHT SHINJUKU vol.32" || Tokyo, Japan || Decision (Unanimous)  || 3 || 3:00
|-
|-  style="background:#cfc;"
| 2013-06-16 || Win ||align=left| Yoshiki || Krush.29 || Tokyo, Japan || Decision (Unanimous)  || 3 || 3:00
|-
|-  style="background:#cfc;"
| 2013-03-20 || Win ||align=left| Keisuke Ishida|| Krush.27 || Tokyo, Japan || Decision (Unanimous)  || 3 || 3:00
|-
|-  style="background:#cfc;"
| 2012-11-23 || Win ||align=left| Ryota ||Krush-EX 2012 vol.6 || Tokyo, Japan || TKO (3 Knockdowns/Left High Kick)  || 3 || 1:20
|-
| colspan=9 | Legend:    

|-  style="background:#cfc;"
| 2012-06-03|| Win||align=left| Rasta Kido || BigBang Amateur 6|| Tokyo, Japan || Decision (Unanimous) || 2 ||1:30
|-  style="background:#cfc;"
| 2012-03-11|| Win||align=left| Daisuke Hirano || KAMINARIMON|| Tokyo, Japan || KO || 2 ||
|-  style="background:#cfc;"
| 2011-12-18|| Win||align=left| Sho Oota || KAMINARIMON|| Tokyo, Japan || Decision (Unanimous) || 2 ||1:30
|-
| colspan=9 | Legend:

See also
 List of male kickboxers

References

Living people
1996 births
Japanese male kickboxers
Kunlun Fight kickboxers
Bantamweight kickboxers
Sportspeople from Kanagawa Prefecture